Norma Liliam Kechichián García (born 2 March 1952 in Montevideo) is a Uruguayan politician.

Background

Born in a family of Armenian descent, she has been active in the Frente Amplio (Broad Front) since its establishment.

Political offices

In 1999, she joined the Progressive Alliance sector. In 2004 she was elected to the Parliament Soon she was appointed Deputy Minister of Tourism, alongside Héctor Lescano. In May 2012 she was appointed Minister of Tourism, thus serving in the Administrations of both Presidents Tabaré Vázquez and José Mujica.

See also

 Broad Front %28Uruguay%29#Ideology

References

External links

1952 births
Uruguayan people of Armenian descent
Uruguayan politicians
Progressive Alliance (Uruguay) politicians
Women government ministers of Uruguay
Ministers of Tourism and Sport of Uruguay
Living people
Ethnic Armenian politicians
People from Montevideo